Mary Kills People is a Canadian drama television series starring Caroline Dhavernas. It premiered on Global on January 25, 2017.

On June 5, 2017, the series was renewed for a second season, which was scheduled to premiere on Global's video-on-demand platforms on January 1 before premiering on television on January 3, 2018.

On 4 June 2018 the series was renewed for a third and final season by Global.

Premise
Dr. Mary Harris works at the emergency department of the Eden General Hospital and has a side business as an end of life counselor—she and her partner Des provide assisted suicide. Their lives get complicated when the police start investigating them.

Cast
 Caroline Dhavernas as Mary Harris
 Jay Ryan as Detective Ben Wesley, who is investigating Mary and goes undercover briefly as terminally ill patient Joel Collins
 Richard Short as Desmond "Des" Bennett, Mary's business partner
 Lyriq Bent as Detective Frank Gaines, who is working the case with Ben
 Greg Bryk as Grady Burgess, Des's former drug dealer who provided him and Mary with pentobarbital (season 1)
 Sebastien Roberts as Kevin, Mary's ex-husband
 Abigail Winter as Jessica "Jess", Mary's teenage daughter
 Charlotte Sullivan as Nicole Mitchell, Mary's sister
 Grace Lynn Kung as Annie Chung, a nurse at Eden General who refers patients to Mary and Des
 Jess Salgueiro as Larissa, Des's girlfriend
 Katie Douglas as Naomi Malik, Jess's friend
 Alexandra Castillo as Louise Malick, a lawyer who is Naomi's mother and Kevin's girlfriend
 Joel Thomas Hynes as Sidney "Sid" Thomas-Haye (season 1)
 Lola Flanery as Cambie, Mary's younger daughter
 Terra Hazelton as Rhonda McCartney, a nurse at Eden General
 Matt Gordon as Dennis Taylor
 Rachelle Lefevre as Olivia Bloom, Grady's sister (season 2)
 Rachael Ancheril as Lucy Oliviera (season 3)
 Elizabeth Saunders as Nurse Francis (season 3)
 Laura de Carteret as Dr. Ingress

Production 
The series, which was to comprise six episodes, was commissioned by TV network Global on January 28, 2016. Production began in summer 2016, and the first episode aired January 25, 2017. In the United States, the series was picked up by Lifetime on October 13, 2016. Mary Kills People premiered in the US on Lifetime on April 23, 2017.

As of January 23, 2017, there were talks to produce a second season according to Metro News and Caroline Dhavernas. On June 5, 2017, the series was renewed for a six-episode followup season. Production occurred over summer 2017 in Toronto. Lifetime announced their pickup of the second season in the United States on July 28, 2017; it premiered on March 12, 2018.

On December 3, 2018, it was announced that Lifetime would not air the final season. The series concluded production at the end of the third season.

Episodes

Season 1 (2017)

Season 2 (2018)

Season 3 (2019)

Reception

Critical response
The first season has received a score of 66 on Metacritic, indicating generally favourable reviews, based on eight reviews, and a rating of 100% on review aggregation website Rotten Tomatoes based on eleven reviews for an average rating of 7.5/10, the site's critical consensus stating: "Mary Kills People is more than its unique premise, with a layered lead performance and consistently entertaining narrative keeping the show's dark comedy grounded in relatable reality." The second season also received 100% based on five reviews, for an average rating of 9.4/10.

John Doyle of The Globe and Mail called the first episode of the show "remarkably assured, droll and adult. It’s very smart and utterly intriguing." He praises Mary Harris as "one of the most compelling, original female characters in years" and Caroline Dhavernas as "exceptional" in her portrayal: "Perhaps the best thing about it is the crazy sparkle in Mary’s eyes. There is something anarchic bubbling inside her."

Variety's Maureen Ryan said the show "pulls off a melding of tones — comedic, dramatic, and philosophical — that seems next to impossible," but criticized the first season's romance subplots.

Awards

References

External links
 

2010s Canadian drama television series
2010s Canadian medical television series
Global Television Network original programming
Television series by Entertainment One
Television series by Corus Entertainment
2017 Canadian television series debuts
Lifetime (TV network) original programming
Television episodes about euthanasia
2019 Canadian television series endings